Nærum station is a railway station serving the suburb of Nærum north of Copenhagen in North Zealand, Denmark.

Nærum station is the northern terminus of the Nærum railway line from Jægersborg to Nærum. The first Nærum station was opened in 1900 with the opening of the railway line between Kongens Lyngby and Vedbæk. The northern half of the railway line between Nærum and Vedbæk quickly proved unprofitable and was abandoned in 1923. The Nærum end of the line was shortened a bit in 1954 due to the construction of the Helsingør motorway, and Nærum station was moved to its current location. The train services are operated by the railway company Lokaltog which runs frequent local train services from the station to Jægersborg station that connect to the Copenhagen S-train system at Jægersborg.

See also
 List of railway stations in Denmark

References

External links

 Lokaltog

Railway stations opened in 1900
Railway stations in the Capital Region of Denmark
Railway stations in Denmark opened in the 20th century